James Lynch (December 25, 1888 – death unknown) was an American Negro league outfielder in the 1910s and 1920s. 

A native of San Antonio, Texas, Lynch made his Negro leagues debut in 1912 with the French Lick Plutos. He went on to play for the West Baden Sprudels, Indianapolis ABCs, and Dayton Marcos through 1918, and briefly played for the Marcos again in 1926 when they joined the Negro National League.

References

External links
 and Baseball-Reference Black Baseball stats and Seamheads

1888 births
Place of death missing
Year of death missing
Dayton Marcos players
French Lick Plutos players
Indianapolis ABCs players
West Baden Sprudels players
Baseball outfielders
Baseball players from San Antonio